United Nigeria Airlines Limited, trading as United Nigeria Airlines, is a private
airline in Nigeria. The new start-up received its Air Operators Certificate (AOC), on 1 February 2021. Headquartered in the city of Enugu, with an office in Abuja, and with its operations base at Enugu International Airport, United Nigeria Airlines started with four aircraft to operate scheduled flights between nine Nigerian cities: Abuja, Owerri, Imo, Yenagoa, Bayelsa, Osubi, Delta, Anambra, Anambra, Port Harcourt, Rivers, Asaba, Enugu, and Lagos.

Overview
United Nigeria Airlines was established in 2020. It is a wholly owned subsidiary of United Nigeria Airlines Limited, a Nigerian company affiliated with Prof. Obiorah Okonkwo, a Russian-trained political scientist, businessman and entrepreneur. 

The airline took delivery of four 50-seater Embraer ERJ-145LR aircraft during the second half of 2020. After rigorous examination by the
Nigerian Civil Aviation Authority (NCAA), which included test flights, NCAA granted the airline an AOC on 1 February 2021. The initial AOC is valid until 31 January 2023.

On 12 February 2021, United Nigeria Airlines' inaugural flight from Murtala Muhammed International Airport, Ikeja, Lagos State, Nigeria to Akanu Ibiam International Airport, Enugu, Enugu State, Nigeria, had a 100 percent passenger load factor.

Destinations
As of April 2021, United Nigeria Airlines maintained regular scheduled services to the following destinations:

Fleet
The United Nigeria Airlines fleet consists of the following aircraft as of February 2021:

Incidents and accidents
 On 17 November 2021, a United Nigeria Embraer 145 with 43 passengers and 4 crew flying from Abuja to Lagos reported hearing two loud explosions followed by an engine flameout after departure. The crew declared a "Mayday" and returned safely to land in Abuja on a single engine. The preliminary investigation by the Accident Investigation Bureau (Nigeria) revealed that the Flight Data Recorder had been disabled and did not record the incident flight.

See also
 Airlines of Africa 
 List of airlines of Nigeria

References

External links
 Official Website
United Nigeria Airlines aoc ready as other new entrants set to get approvals
 United Nigeria Airlines will conduct its inaugural flight on Friday, February 12, 2021
United Nigeria Airlines starts operations eyes west coast for long term expansion/
United Nigeria Airlines unveils medium term plans for aircraft acquisition MRO establishment in enugu

Airlines of Nigeria
Airlines established in 2020
Enugu
2020 establishments in Nigeria